The Perry Plaza Court Historic District encompasses a historic tourist accommodation at 1007 Park Avenue in Hot Springs, Arkansas.  It consists of a long two-story brick building in the International style, along with a small office building and swimming pool.  It houses 19 single-bedroom units, which are now rented as apartments.  Built in 1947–48, it is a fine example of the International Style.  The unit interiors retain a number of period features, including tile and plumbing fixtures.

The property was listed on the National Register of Historic Places in 2004.

It was designed by Hot Springs architect Irven D. McDaniel.

See also
National Register of Historic Places listings in Garland County, Arkansas

References

International style architecture in Arkansas
Buildings and structures completed in 1947
Buildings and structures in Hot Springs, Arkansas
Historic districts on the National Register of Historic Places in Arkansas
National Register of Historic Places in Hot Springs, Arkansas